Lariviere may refer to:
 
Larivière-Arnoncourt, a commune in the Haute-Marne department in northeastern France
Larivière, a 19th-century Canadian sleigh and bus manufacturer
Alphonse Alfred Clément Larivière (1842–1925), a Canadian politician and journalist, son of Montreal carriage builder Abraham Clément Larivière
André Larivière (born 1948), a Canadian ecologist and anti-nuclear activist
Charles-Philippe Larivière (1798–1876), a French academic painter and lithographer
Garry Lariviere, (born 1954), retired Canadian ice hockey player
Jacinthe Larivière, (born 1981), a Canadian figure skater 
Nil-Élie Larivière (1899–1969), a Canadian politician
Richard W. Lariviere (born 1950), president of the University of Oregon
Joe Lariviere (born 1981), stand up guy